Ilbandornis was a genus of ostrich-sized dromornithid. It was far more lightly built than other members of the family, indicating a more cursorial lifestyle. The majority of researchers consider Dromornithids to be herbivorous; this is borne out by molecular analysis of the gastroliths and eggshells of both Ilbandornis and the related Genyornis. While Ilbandornis and Genyornis have skulls of similar size to emus, other Dromornithids such as Bullockornis and Dromornis have far more robust skulls with large beaks; these were previously considered an adaptation for carnivory, but their blunt edges and lack of hooked tip indicate that the species were herbivorous. It is therefore likely that the differences in skull shape are due to differences in diet.

There are currently two species included in the genus, Ilbandornis lawsoni and Ilbandornis woodburnei. Both are known from the Alcoota Fossil Beds in the Northern Territory, from Waite Formation sediments dating to the Late Miocene.
The local fauna at the alcoota site includes another dromornithid species, the gigantic Dromornis stirtoni.

References 

Dromornithidae
Extinct flightless birds
Miocene birds of Australia
Miocene birds
Prehistoric bird genera